The Pace That Thrills is a 1952 American action film directed by Leon Barsha and written by Robert Lee Johnson and DeVallon Scott. The film stars Bill Williams, Carla Balenda, Robert Armstrong, Frank McHugh and Michael St. Angel. The film was released on March 21, 1952, by RKO Pictures.

Plot
Los Angeles newspaper reporter Eve Drake is assigned to cover a motorcycle race. There she sees Dusty Weston win a race using questionable tactics. She is asked to present the winner's trophy afterward, but when Dusty plants a kiss on her, she slaps his face.

Eve's critical article irks Dusty and his employer, J.C. Barton, who owns a motorcycle factory. At a home belonging to his mechanic pal Rocket Anderson, they discuss Eve with rival cyclist Chris Rhodes, another friend. Chris suggests softening her up and invites Eve to pay another visit. She enjoys a cycle ride until Chris and Dusty try to elude two motorcycle police officers and crash into a ditch.

Chris then suffers a leg injury in a race after Dusty's dangerous maneuver. Dusty is fired, after which Chris is given a new hydraulic bike to race that Barton needs to be a success if he is going to be able to keep his factory up and running. Chris protests that Dusty is the better rider and could win the big race on the new bike. Barton refuses to budge, and while Dusty takes a job as a trick rider for a carnival.

Chris falls in love with Eve, but she's romantically attracted to Dusty and unsure what to do. Chris punches him when Dusty says they intend to marry. Dusty then surprisingly enters the big race, competing against Chris and the new Barton bike. At the last minute, when Chris takes a spill, Dusty deliberately does the same, giving Chris a chance to get back up and be victorious. A grateful Chris congratulates his friend and Eve on their engagement.

Cast 
Bill Williams as Richard L. 'Dusty' Weston
Carla Balenda as Eve Drake
Robert Armstrong as J.C. Barton
Frank McHugh as Rocket Anderson
Michael St. Angel as Chris Rhodes 
Cleo Moore as Ruby
John Mitchum as Blackie Meyers 
Diane Garrett as Opal
John Hamilton as Sour Puss
Claudia Drake as Pearl

References

External links 
 

1952 films
1950s sports films
American auto racing films
American black-and-white films
Motorcycle racing films
RKO Pictures films
Films directed by Leon Barsha
1950s English-language films
1950s American films